Oleh Andriyovych Ocheretko (born 25 May 2003) is a Ukrainian professional footballer who plays as a midfielder for Shakhtar Donetsk in the Ukrainian Premier League.

Career
Born in Makiivka, Donetsk Oblast, Ocheretko is a product of Shakhtar Donetsk youth sportive school system and signed a loan contract with FC Mariupol in the Ukrainian Premier League in September 2020.

He made his début for FC Mariupol in the Ukrainian Premier League as a second half-time substitute in the drawing away match against FC Inhulets Petrove on 25 October 2020.

References

External links
 
 

2003 births
Living people
Sportspeople from Makiivka
Ukrainian footballers
FC Mariupol players
FC Shakhtar Donetsk players
Ukrainian Premier League players
Association football midfielders
Ukraine youth international footballers
Ukraine under-21 international footballers